"O.T.T" is a single by British rapper Fugative. It was released on 6 January 2013 on digital download. The track was written and produced By Fugative; this is the first single Fugative has released in three years.

Track listing

Release history

References

External links
 Official website
 Fugative on Twitter
 Lyrics of this song - O.T.T

2012 songs
2013 singles
Fugative songs